Nis (also Romanized as Nīs and Neys; also known as Vālī-ye ‘Aşr) is a village in Hoseynabad Rural District, in the Central District of Shush County, Khuzestan Province, Iran. At the 2006 census, its population was 221, in 45 families.

References 

Populated places in Shush County